1908 in sports describes the year's events in world sport.

American football
College championship
 College football national championship – Penn Quakers

Association football
Belgium
 R.S.C. Anderlecht was founded in Brussels Region on May 27. 
Brazil
 25 March — Clube Atlético Mineiro founded
England
 The Football League – Manchester United 52 points, Aston Villa 43, Manchester City 43, Newcastle United 42, The Wednesday 42, Middlesbrough 41
 FA Cup final – Wolverhampton Wanderers 3–1 Newcastle United at Crystal Palace, London
 Bradford Park Avenue (1908–70) and Tottenham Hotspur elected to the Football League after Lincoln City and Stoke FC are expelled.  Stoke FC is not involved in the election process but goes into receivership soon afterwards and is replaced by Tottenham Hotspur, who have lost the election to Bradford Park Avenue.
Germany
 National Championship – Viktoria Berlin 3–0 Stuttgarter Kickers at Berlin-Tempelhof 
Greece
 3 February — Panathinaikos, Greece's most successful sports club is founded in Athens, Greece by Georgios Kalafatis.
Italy
 9 March — Internazionale Milan founded
Mexico
 Club Union of Mexico becomes Club Deportivo Guadalajara
Netherlands
 19 July — Feyenoord Rotterdam founded
Scotland
 Scottish Football League – Celtic
 Scottish Cup final – Celtic 5–1 St Mirren at Hampden Park

Australian rules football
VFL Premiership
 Carlton wins the 12th VFL Premiership: Carlton 5.5 (35) d Essendon 3.8 (26) at Melbourne Cricket Ground (MCG)
Events
 Richmond and University join the VFL

Bandy
Sweden
 Championship final – Djurgårdens IF 3–1 Östergötlands BF

Baseball
World Series
 10–14 October — Chicago Cubs (NL) defeats Detroit Tigers (AL) to win the 1908 World Series by 4 games to 1
Events
 23 September — the Merkle incident, which finally costs New York Giants the NL pennant
 Major League Baseball's lowest scoring season including the current record for fewest runs scored in a season by one team: 372 by St. Louis Cardinals
 Baseball Writers' Association of America (BBWAA) founded

Boxing
Events
 4 July — Battling Nelson recovers his World Lightweight Championship from Joe Gans with a 17th-round knockout at Colma, California
 World Middleweight Champion Stanley Ketchel loses his title on 7 September to Billy Papke by a 12th-round technical knockout at Vernon, California, but regains it on 26 November at Colma, California, where he knocks out Papke in the 11th round
 October – Mike "Twin" Sullivan vacates the World Welterweight Championship which remains unresolved until 1914
 26 December — Jack Johnson becomes the first African American World Heavyweight Champion by defeating Tommy Burns at Sydney, Australia.  Johnson holds the title until 1915.
Lineal world champions
 World Heavyweight Championship – Tommy Burns → Jack Johnson
 World Light Heavyweight Championship – vacant
 World Middleweight Championship – Stanley Ketchel → Billy Papke → Stanley Ketchel
 World Welterweight Championship – Mike "Twin" Sullivan → vacant
 World Lightweight Championship – Joe Gans → Battling Nelson
 World Featherweight Championship – Abe Attell
 World Bantamweight Championship – Jimmy Walsh

Cricket
England
 County Championship – Yorkshire
 Minor Counties Championship – Staffordshire
 Most runs – Tom Hayward 2337 @ 45.82 (HS 175)
 Most wickets – Colin Blythe 197 @ 16.88 (BB 8–83)
 Wisden Cricketers of the Year – Walter Brearley, Lord Hawke, Jack Hobbs, Alan Marshal, John Newstead
Australia
 Sheffield Shield – Victoria 
 Most runs – Joe Hardstaff senior 1360 @ 52.30 (HS 135)
 Most wickets – Jack Saunders and Jack Crawford 66 apiece
India
 Bombay Triangular – Parsees
New Zealand
 Plunket Shield – Auckland
South Africa
 Currie Cup – Western Province
West Indies
 Inter-Colonial Tournament – not contested

Cycling
Tour de France
 Lucien Petit-Breton (France) wins the 6th Tour de France

Field hockey
Olympic Games (Men's Competition)
 Gold Medal – England
 Silver Medal – Ireland
 Bronze Medals – Scotland & Wales

Figure skating
Events
 Inaugural International Skating Union (ISU) Championships for pair skating is held at Saint Petersburg
 Figure skating is held at the 1908 Summer Olympics and is the first winter sport to feature at the Olympics — 16 years before the inaugural Winter Games is held
World Figure Skating Championships
 World Men's Champion – Ulrich Salchow (Sweden)
 World Women's Champion – Lily Kronberger (Hungary)
 World Pairs Champions – Anna Hübler and Heinrich Burger (Germany)
1908 Summer Olympics
 Men's individual – Ulrich Salchow (Sweden)
 Men's special figures – Nikolai Panin (Russia)
 Women's individual – Madge Syers (Great Britain)
 Pairs – Anna Hübler and Heinrich Burger (Germany)

Golf
Major tournaments
 British Open – James Braid
 US Open – Fred McLeod 
Other tournaments
 British Amateur – Edward Lassen 
 US Amateur – Jerome Travers

Horse racing
England
 Grand National – Rubio
 1,000 Guineas Stakes – Rhodora
 2,000 Guineas Stakes – Norman
 The Derby – Signorinetta
 The Oaks – Signorinetta
 St. Leger Stakes – Your Majesty
Australia
 Melbourne Cup – Lord Nolan
Canada
 King's Plate – Seismic
Ireland
 Irish Grand National – Lord Rivers
 Irish Derby Stakes – Wild Bouquet
USA
 Kentucky Derby – Stone Street
 Preakness Stakes – Royal Tourist
 Belmont Stakes – Colin

Ice hockey
Events
 January 2 — The first All-Star game in ice hockey history is held at Montreal to benefit the widow of Hod Stuart, killed in an off-season swimming accident.
Stanley Cup
 January 9–13 – Montreal Wanderers defeat the Ottawa Victorias 9–3, 13–1 (22–4) in a two-game challenge to retain the Stanley Cup.
 March 7 — Montreal Wanderers win the Eastern Canada Amateur Hockey Association (ECAHA) championship for the third year in a row and successfully defend the Stanley Cup.
 March 10–12 – Montreal Wanderers defeat Winnipeg Maple Leafs 11–5, 9–3 (20–8) in a two-game challenge.
 March 14 – Montreal Wanderers defeat Toronto Professionals 6–4 in a one-game challenge to retain the Stanley Cup.

Lacrosse
Events
 Lacrosse is played as an Olympic sport for the second and last time (the first having been in 1904). Canada defeats Great Britain: they are the only two teams to compete.

Motorsport

Olympic Games
1908 Summer Olympics
 The 1908 Summer Olympics takes place in London
 Great Britain wins the most medals (145) and the most gold medals (56)

Rowing
The Boat Race
 4 April — Cambridge wins the 65th Oxford and Cambridge Boat Race

Rugby league
Events
 Hunslet becomes the first team to achieve the celebrated "All Four Cups" feat
England
 Championship – Hunslet
 Challenge Cup final – Hunslet 14–0 Hull F.C. at Fartown Ground, Huddersfield
 Lancashire League Championship – Oldham
 Yorkshire League Championship – Hunslet
 Lancashire County Cup – Oldham 16–9 Broughton Rangers  
 Yorkshire County Cup – Hunslet 17–0 Halifax
Australia
 Professional rugby league begins in Australia with the formation of the New South Wales Rugby League 
 South Sydney wins the first Australian championship, defeating Eastern Suburbs 14–12 in the final
 First Australian national rugby league team embarks on the inaugural 1908–09 Kangaroo tour of Great Britain

Rugby union
Home Nations Championship
 26th Home Nations Championship series is won by Wales
 As Wales also defeats France in a 1908 non-championship match, its team is retrospectively regarded as a Grand Slam winner

Speed skating
Speed Skating World Championships
 Men's All-round Champion – Oscar Mathisen (Norway)

Tennis
Australia
 Australian Men's Singles Championship – Fred Alexander (USA) defeats Alfred Dunlop (Australia) 3–6 3–6 6–0 6–2 6–3
England
 Wimbledon Men's Singles Championship – Arthur Gore (GB) defeats Herbert Barrett (GB) 6–3 6–2 4–6 3–6 6–4
 Wimbledon Women's Singles Championship – Charlotte Cooper Sterry (GB) defeats Agnes Morton (GB) 6–4 6–4 
France
 French Men's Singles Championship – Max Decugis (France) defeats Maurice Germot (France): details unknown
 French Women's Singles Championship – Kate Gillou-Fenwick (France) defeats Pean (France): details unknown
USA
 American Men's Singles Championship – William Larned (USA) defeats Beals Wright (USA) 6–1 6–2 8–6
 American Women's Singles Championship – Maud Barger-Wallach (USA) defeats Evelyn Sears (USA) 6–3 1–6 6–3
Davis Cup
 1908 International Lawn Tennis Challenge –  3–2  at Albert Ground (grass) Melbourne, Australia

References

 
Sports by year